Imam Ahmad may refer to:
 Ahmad bin Yahya (1891–1962), the penultimate king of the Mutawakkilite Kingdom of Yemen
 Ahmad ibn Hanbal (780–855), Muslim scholar and theologian